Röderland is a municipality in the Elbe-Elster district, in Brandenburg, Germany.

History
From 1952 to 1990, the constituent localities of Röderland were part of the Bezirk Cottbus of East Germany. On 26 October 2003, the municipality of Röderland was formed by merging the municipalities of Haida, Prösen, Reichenhain, Saathain, Stolzenhain and Wainsdorf.

Demography

References

Localities in Elbe-Elster